Polanka Horyniecka  (Polianka Horynets’ka) is a village in the administrative district of Gmina Horyniec-Zdrój, within Lubaczów County, Subcarpathian Voivodeship, in south-eastern Poland, close to the border with Ukraine.

The village was established in the course of Josephine colonization by German Roman Catholic and Calvinist settlers in 1785.

References

Polanka Horyniecka